Merrimack Pharmaceuticals is a pharmaceutical company based in Cambridge, Massachusetts, United States. They specialize in developing drugs for the treatment of cancer.

Merrimack's first FDA-approved drug was approved in 2015; Onivyde, a liposome encapsulated version of irinotecan is used for treating pancreatic adenocarcinoma. It was approved for use in the European Union the following year.

History 
Merrimack was founded by a group of scientists from MIT and Harvard University in 2000.

In 2016, Merrimack had 426 full-time employees, 103 of which had an MD or PhD.

In October 2016, CEO Robert Mulroy resigned and the company announced they would be laying off 20% of its employees. In January 2017, interim CEO Gary Crocker resigned and the board of directors appointed Richard Peters to be president and CEO. Peters previously worked at Sanofi and was a faculty member at Harvard University.

In January 2017, French pharmaceutical company Ipsen announced they would be purchasing Onivyde from Merrimack for approximately $1 billion.

On November 13, 2018, the statistical programming director Songjiang Wang, received "six months in prison and one year supervised released" after a guilty verdict was handed down to Wang from a United States District Judge in July 2018 for securities fraud and conspiracy to commit securities fraud. Also on December 20, 2019, the United States Securities and Exchange Commission charged Wang with Insider trading.

Pipeline 
Merrimack has four drugs in clinical development.
 MM-302 – HER2 targeting antibody-drug conjugate
 MM-121 (seribantumab) – anti-HER3 monoclonal antibody
 MM-141 (istiratumab) – IGF-1R and HER3 bispecific monoclonal antibody
 MM-151 – anti-EGFR mixture of monoclonal antibody

References 

Pharmaceutical companies of the United States
Life sciences industry
Health care companies based in Massachusetts
Pharmaceutical companies established in 2000
Companies based in Cambridge, Massachusetts
2000 establishments in Massachusetts
Companies listed on the Nasdaq
2012 initial public offerings